Robert Lynn (born February 7, 1967) is an American water polo player. He competed in the men's tournament at the 2000 Summer Olympics.

Early life 
He attended Wilson High School in Long Beach, California, and the University of Southern California, where he held a scoring record for 20 years.

Water polo and coaching career 
Lynn played in the 2000 Sydney Summer Olympics and was a member of the Men's National Team program from 1989 to 2001. He played professionally in Croatia, Italy, Greece and France for 13 years. In 2006 and 2007, he was named head coach of USA Water Polo's Youth National Team. The following year, he was named assistant coach of the USA Men's Olympic Water Polo Team.

References

External links
 

1967 births
Living people
American male water polo players
Olympic water polo players of the United States
Water polo players at the 2000 Summer Olympics
Sportspeople from Long Beach, California